C. L. "Chink" Taylor (February 9, 1898 – July 7, 1980) was an American professional baseball outfielder during the 1920s. He played in eight games for the Chicago Cubs of Major League Baseball in 1925.

Taylor played in the minor leagues from 1921 to 1929 (except for 1923), appearing in 1109 games while compiling a .307 batting average. Per Taylor's draft registration cards of September 1918 and February 1942, his given name was "C. L." (initials only). He was one of several baseball players in the first half of the 20th century with the nickname "Chink".

Taylor died in July 1980 at the age of 82; he was survived by his wife and two sons.

References

External links

1898 births
1980 deaths
Major League Baseball outfielders
Chicago Cubs players
Baseball players from Texas
People from Burnet, Texas
Fort Worth Panthers players
Paris Snappers players
Beaumont Exporters players
Shreveport Sports players
Chattanooga Lookouts players
Houston Buffaloes players